A rubber duck race is a type of festival where thousands of rubber ducks race on a river, usually within the city. Normally they are fundraising events and the ducks are given numbers which enables the participants to "adopt" a rubber duck for a small amount of money. If the rubber duck wins or places well, the participants will win money or a prize of some sort.

The proceeds of "adopting" a rubber duck go to the nonprofit organization that is in charge of the event. In legal terms, a rubber duck race would be classified as a raffle in Germany.

The location and origin of the first rubber duck race is unclear, such as one source stating it took place in 1987 in Ottawa, Canada, while another says that a charity in Dyserth, Wales, held its first annual rubber duck race in 1980.

In the 1990s rubber duck races spread across the industrialised world. Nowadays, they are regarded as a more inventive kind of fundraising and the rubber duck is a symbol of the generosity of the organiser. In comparison to other types of raffles, a duck race involves a considerable amount of preparation. To some extent organisers are already afraid of potential risks, seeing as duck races apparently take place too often. The races are further controversial in terms of environmental protection, given that thousands of plastic objects are put into the water and there is no guarantee of them all being completely taken out of the water after the end of the race.

The number of rubber ducks used in such races differs considerably, however, organisers state an average of 3,000 ducks used. The biggest duck race so far has taken place on London's River Thames on 31 August 2008. It was called the Great British Duck Race, with 250,000 blue rubber ducks in usage. Thereby the organisers broke their own record of the previous year, where 165,000 yellow rubber ducks were used. Germany's biggest rubber duck race took place in Cologne in 2001 with 50,000 ducks floating on the "Fühlinger See". The race in the area of Trier–Saarbrücken–Schweich received an award by the initiative "Deutschland – Land der Ideen" as one of 365 projects.

In 2008 fifty-one duck races took place in Germany. The races attract up to 80,000 spectators. The ducks for the races are specially made with a very flat base and a small metal weight for stabilisation purposes. Additionally, these ducks make no sound. The ducks are numbered now and participants can rent as many as they want. Since 2008 the organisers of the Great British Duck Race have used blue ducks instead of the traditional yellow ones, because some people bring their own rubber ducks and set them in the water near the finish line.

See also 
 Teddy bear parachuting

Literature 
 Lotte Larsen Meyer: Rubber Ducks! Their Significance in Contemporary American Culture. In: The Journal of American Culture. Band 29, Issue 1, 2008, S. 14–23.

References 

Charity fundraisers
Ducks in popular culture